Gordon Carew (born 21 October 1965) is a Guyanese boxer. He competed in the men's lightweight event at the 1984 Summer Olympics.

His younger brother, Dillon Carew, also represented Guyana, boxing in the light welterweight division at the 1992 Summer Olympics.

References

External links
 

1965 births
Living people
Guyanese male boxers
Olympic boxers of Guyana
Boxers at the 1984 Summer Olympics
Place of birth missing (living people)
Lightweight boxers